"Road Trippin" is a song by American rock band Red Hot Chili Peppers from their seventh studio album, Californication (1999). It was released as the album's fifth and final single in December 2000.

Background 
The single was released only in Australia and Europe; in the former region, it was released on December 11, 2000, while in the United Kingdom, it was issued on January 1, 2001. A music video was also made but never released in the United States until the band released their Greatest Hits album in 2003. Two versions of the single were released in the UK, but only the first was available elsewhere. A third, compilation version was released in Australia. With the song being only released in Europe it is amongst the least-known singles the band has released. As a result, it did not garner much recognition or airplay outside the band's fanbase.

The song tells of a road trip along the Pacific Coast Highway in which lead singer Anthony Kiedis, guitarist John Frusciante and bassist Flea surfed at Big Sur following Frusciante's return to the band. Drummer Chad Smith did not take the trip with his bandmates due to other commitments and also because he wasn't into surfing. The song is entirely acoustic, and is one of few Peppers' album tracks (along with "Lovin and Touchin", "Thirty Dirty Birds", "Pea", "If" & "Tangelo") not to feature drums. As such, Chad Smith only appears briefly halfway through the video, arriving in a boat.

Live performances 
"Road Trippin'" has only ever been performed live four times and not since 2004, although previous guitarist Josh Klinghoffer did do a tease of the song during the I'm with You tour in 2012.

Track listings 
Single CD1
 "Road Trippin'" (album version) – 3:26
 "Californication" (live) – 6:03
 "Blood Sugar Sex Magik" (live) – 4:21
 "Road Trippin'" (enhanced video)

Single CD2 
 "Road Trippin'" (album version) – 3:26
 "Under the Bridge" (live) – 4:28
 "If You Have to Ask" (live) – 5:21

Single CD3
 "Road Trippin'" (album version)
 "Californication" (live) – 6:03
 "Blood Sugar Sex Magik" (live) – 4:21
 "Under the Bridge" (live) – 4:28

Australian single
 "Road Trippin'" (album version) – 3:26
 "Californication" (live) – 6:03
 "Blood Sugar Sex Magik" (live) – 4:21
 "Under the Bridge" (live) – 4:27
 "If You Have to Ask" (live) – 5:20

Personnel 
Red Hot Chili Peppers
 Anthony Kiedis – lead vocals
 John Frusciante – acoustic guitar, backing vocals
 Flea – acoustic bass guitar

Additional personnel
 Patrick Warren – Chamberlin organ

Charts

Release history

References 

1999 songs
2000 singles
Music videos directed by Jonathan Dayton and Valerie Faris
Red Hot Chili Peppers songs
Songs about roads
Song recordings produced by Rick Rubin
Songs written by Anthony Kiedis
Songs written by Flea (musician)
Songs written by John Frusciante
Warner Records singles